is a 1957 Japanese tokusatsu science fiction film directed by Ishirō Honda, with special effects by Eiji Tsuburaya. The film begins with a giant fissure destroying an entire village. This leads to an investigation whereby the source is discovered to be Moguera, a giant robot, who is then destroyed by the military. The remains are analyzed and discovered to be of alien origin. Shortly after, an alien race known as the Mysterians arrive, declaring they have taken some Earth women captive and that they demand both land and the right to marry women of Earth.

For The Mysterians, producer Tomoyuki Tanaka recruited Jojiro Okami, a science fiction writer, to develop the story. Honda later elaborated that he wanted the film to differ from both Godzilla and Rodan and to make it more of a "true science fiction film," one to promote peace and understanding between cultures. The film was popular upon its release in Japan, where it was among the top ten grossing domestic productions of the year. Contemporary reviews from Western critics in the Monthly Film Bulletin and Variety praised the special effect work but criticized the plot as confusing and juvenile, respectively.

The film was the inspiration for the 60s garage rock band ? and the Mysterians.

Plot
Astrophysicist Ryoichi Shiraishi, his fiancée Hiroko, his sister Etsuko, and his friend Joji Atsumi attend a festival at a local village near Mount Fuji. Shiraishi then tells Atsumi that he has broken off his engagement with Hiroko but gives no reason other than an undisclosed obligation to remain in the village. Then, a  mysterious forest fire flares up, burning more rapidly than normal and emanating from the ground, and Shiraishi rushes out to investigate and disappears during the confusion.

The next day, Atsumi is at the local observatory, where he meets with his mentor, head astronomer, Tanjiro Adachi. He hands the doctor a report written by Shiraishi that concerns a newly discovered asteroid that Shiraishi theorized was once a planet between Mars and Jupiter. He has named it Mysteroid. However, Adachi does not believe in his radical theory and also points out that the report is not complete.

Meanwhile, the village in which the festival was held is completely wiped out by a massive earthquake. While investigating the area, Atsumi and a group of police officers stumble upon a giant robot, Moguera, which bursts from the side of a hill. It emits rays which decimate the investigation team; only Atsumi and the lead policeman survive. The robot then advances to a town near Koyama Bridge that night, and is met by heavy resistance from Japan's self-defense force. However, the conventional artillery has no effect on the war machine, and the automaton continues its rampage until it tries to cross the Koyama Bridge, which is detonated, sending the machine crashing down to the ground below and destroying it.

At the National Diet Building, Atsumi briefs officials on what has been learned about the robot. The remains of the giant machine reveal that it was manufactured out of an unknown chemical compound. Shortly afterwards, astronomers witness activity in outer space around the moon. They alert the world to this discovery, and not long after, the aliens emerge, their gigantic dome breaking through Earth's crust near Mount Fuji.

As a combined military and scientific entourage observes the dome, a voice calls out to request five scientists, including Dr. Adachi, who is among the observers, to come to the dome for a conference. The men agree to this meeting and are formally ushered into the dome, where the Mysterians, a scientifically advanced humanoid alien race, list their demands from the people of Earth: a two-mile-radius strip of land and the right to marry women of Earth. The reason for this is that 100,000 years ago their planet—Mysteroid, once the fifth planet from the sun—was destroyed by a nuclear war. Some Mysterians were able to escape to Mars before their planet was rendered unhabitable. However, owing to the nuclear war, strontium-90 has left 80 percent of the aliens' population deformed and crippled. The proposed interbreeding with women on Earth would produce healthier offspring and keep their race alive. The latter part of their demands is downplayed, as they admit to already taking three women captive and reveal two others that they are interested in, one of which is Etsuko.

Japan quickly dismisses this request and begins the mobilization of its armed forces around Mount Fuji. It is also discovered that the missing Shiraishi has sided with the advance race because of their technological achievements. Japan wastes no time, though, and quickly launches a full-scale attack against the Mysterians' dome. However, the modern weaponry is no match for their technology, and Japan's forces are easily fought back. Distraught by this setback, Japan sends their plea to other nations that they join to remove the threat of the Mysterians from Earth. The nations around the world answer the plea and in no time issue another raid against the Mysterians' dome, this time utilizing the newly developed Alpha and Beta class airships. Sadly, this attack meets failure as well.

The Mysterians then increase their demand, asking for a 75-mile-radius plot of land, as the Earth continues to develop a new method of attack. Earth's efforts in this matter pay off as a Markalite FAHP (Flying Atomic Heat Projector), a gigantic lens that can reflect the Mysterians’ weaponry, is designed. Meanwhile, the Mysterians kidnap Etsuko and Hiroko, causing Atsumi to search for, and locate, a cave entrance to a tunnel under the Mysterians' dome.

In the meantime, the Markalite FAHP's are deployed by large Markalite GYRO rockets, and the final battle against the Mysterians' base of operations commences. Atsumi enters the dome and finds the women, alive and unharmed, in an unguarded room. Taking them back to the tunnel, Atsumi finds Shiraishi, who admits the Mysterians duped him and have no good intentions, and then returns to the dome and sacrifices himself in a final attack on the base from the inside while the Markalite FAHP's assault the base from above ground. In the midst of the battle, a second Moguera is deployed from the dome, but is disabled after it attempts to emerge from the ground underneath one of the FAHPs, which falls on top of it. The dome collapses and then explodes as Adachi and the women reach safety in the hills above the Mysterians' occupied land. A few enemy spaceships are observed fleeing into space, out of range of Earth weaponry, and Dr. Adachi comments on the need for continued vigilance.

Cast
 Kenji Sahara as Jōji Atsumi
 Yumi Shirakawa as Etsuko Shiraishi
 Momoko Kōchi as Hiroko Iwamoto
 Akihiko Hirata as Ryōichi Shiraishi
 Takashi Shimura as Dr. Kenjirō Adachi
 Susumu Fujita as General Morita
 Hisaya Itō as Captain Seki
 Yoshio Kosugi as Commander Sugimoto
 Fuyuki Murakami as Dr. Nobu Kawanami
 Tetsu Nakamura as Dr. Kōda
 Yoshio Tsuchiya as Mysterian Leader
 George Furness as Dr. Svenson
 Harold Conway as Dr. DeGracia
 Haruo Nakajima, Katsumi Tezuka as Mogera

Production

Writing
After the success of Godzilla (1954), other Japanese film studios began producing their own sci-fi films such as Daiei's Warning from Space (1956) and Shintoho's Fearful Attack of the Flying Saucers (1956), Toho decided to create their own alien invasion movie. For the film, producer Tomoyuki Tanaka recruited Jojiro Okami, an aeronautical engineer and military test pilot who later became a science fiction writer. Jojiro wrote the story proposal in early 1957 and in the unpublished novel-length story, there were no monsters of any kind nor are the aliens interested in interbreeding with human women. Tanaka, who tried to help get Okami's novel published, liked what he saw in the story and handed it to Shigaru Kayama, who wrote the original Godzilla (1954) further developed it. Kayama's idea for the Mysterians wanting to mate with the earth women to repopulate their dying race was his idea. Tanaka insisted insisted that a monster be included, which was at first an flesh and blood alien monster, a proto-Baragon underground reptile creature.

Ishiro Honda wanted to demonstrate the technological superiority the Mysterians possessed, so it became the giant burrowing, robot monster Mogera instead. There were other differences in early drafts too, instead of emerging from the ground, the Mysterian Dome was supposed to emerge from a lake. Also, the Mysterians were to have an invisible laser that would shoot down planes when they flew too close to their territory at Mt. Fuji. Earlier drafts also portrayed the decision to form the multinational Earth Defense Force as a more controversial in the eyes of the public.

Takeshi Kimura, turned in four versions of the script in total. It's unknown whose idea this was, it's interesting that even though the film is about an alien storyline, a strong anti-nuclear theme was still injected into the film.

Filming
Director Ishiro Honda described the film, saying it was "larger in scale compared to Godzilla or Rodan and is aimed to be more of a true science fiction film ... I would like to wipe away the [Cold War-era] notion of East versus West and convey a simple, universal aspiration for peace, the coming together of all humankind as one to create a peaceful society." For The Mysterians, producer Tomoyuki Tanaka recruited Jojiro Okami, an aeronautical engineer and military test pilot who later became a science fiction writer. Reflecting on the period of developing the film, Honda stated that he respected scientists, but "feared the danger of science, that whoever controlled it could take over the entire Earth."

The Mysterians marks the first collaboration between Honda and special effects director Eiji Tsuburaya that was shot in anamorphic TohoScope, which the studio had just recently introduced. In their book on Honda, Ryfle and Godziszewski stated that accurate budget figures for The Mysterians are elusive. Honda had stated that the film was more expensive than Godzilla and Rodan.

During the film, actor Yoshio Tsuchiya ad-libbed a line from the aliens about Earth trying to divide up the moon to sell it after the Mysterians are denied being able to take claim to a part of the Earth. While the line might seem strange, it came from personal experience. In the 1950s, Tsuchiya belonged to a group called The Space Travel Association that promoted a mission to the moon. The actor was so devoted that he convinced fellow actors Toshiro Mafune and Takashi Shimura to join. Unfortunately, he discovered that the organization was merely looking to divide up the moon for real estate, planning to use the monetary resources they were gathering for this endeavor.

Reflecting on the period of developing the film, Honda stated that he respected scientists, but "feared the danger of science, that whoever controlled it could take over the entire Earth."

Special effects director Eiji Tsuburaya won five technical achievement awards from the Japan Movie Association. One was for his work on The Mysterians.

In an interview conducted just before his death, Ishiro Honda stated that The Mysterians was his favorite film that he directed.

The Mysterians became Toho's first color widescreen special effects film with Perspecta Stereophonic Sound, a simulated stereo process.

The film was a significant hit, earning 193 million yen in the domestic box office. It was Toho's second highest-grossing film of the year, only being behind Hiroshi Inagaki's Rickshaw Man (1957), and was the tenth highest-grossing film in Japan overall.

Special effects
In previous films, Tsuburaya's miniature tanks had been pulled along by wires. For this film, it was decided to move them via remotely-controlled radio waves. Several tanks were prepared with receivers and the order was given to move them; unfortunately, the tanks all homed-in on the same frequency being used at a nearby army base. As a result, the tanks went every which-way. Assistant Masakatsu Asai remembered this in an interview saying, “It caused a great deal of confusion.”

In the first battle between the Japanese military and the Mysterians, many tanks and cannons were melted by the Mysterians heat rays, the effect was done using models made from wax and filmed in fast motion to simulate melting.

During the first battle between the military and the Mysterians, there is a shot of a jet dive-bombing the Dome. To achieve this, special effects photographer Sadamasa Arikawa recalled in an interview, “A crane is only good for long-distance, so we tried ropes around an over-hanging rail. Suspended below it were two wooden boards. Stretched out on the boards was a cameraman and the camera, which ran on batteries. Crewmembers grabbed onto the ropes and pulled the boards along! You know, since a camera cannot fly, it was the only way we could have produced such an image.”

When a tank is caught in a trap set by the Mysterians, a soldier attempts to extricate himself from his tank. As the miniature tank spun about, a detailed doll of the soldier was pulled by a slender thread of nylon pulled the doll out of the tank.

During the flooding scene, a huge wave is covering a live-action shot of a bridge with people running on it. The waters rush is interrupted by the structure. This was achieved by building a miniature model of the bridge, painting it blue, lined it up in frame to match the full-size bridge, and then water was poured over it. When the composited water was layered over the real bridge, they lined up perfectly.

Release
The Mysterians was released on 28 December 1957 in Japan. The film was re-issued theatrically in Japan on 18 March 1978. The film was a "significant hit", earning 193 million yen in the domestic box office. It was Toho's second highest-grossing film of the year, only being behind Hiroshi Inagaki's Rickshaw Man, and was the tenth highest-grossing film in Japan overall.

In the United States, The Mysterians was originally purchased by RKO Radio Pictures, which provided the dubbing, but was sold to Loew's Inc. for release due to RKO's failing fortunes. The film was double-featured with Watusi and released on 15 May 1959 via MGM. According to MGM records, the film made the studio a profit of only $58,000 in the United States.

Reception
From contemporary reviews, The New York Times called the film "an ear-splitting Japanese-made fantasy, photographed in runny color and dubbed English," and concluded: "This Metro release is crammed with routine footage of death rays and scrambling civilians, not one of whom can act." Variety called it "well-produced", noting "special effects involving sliding land, quaking earth and melting mortars are realistically accomplished proving the facility with the Japanese filmmakers deal in miniatures." but found the film "As corny as it is furious" noting that "While Junior may be moved by the arrival of outer-space gremlins, big brother and all like him will laugh their heads off." The review commented on the English dub, stating that it was "understandable enough, but one might easily believe something was lost in translation." Harrison's Reports wrote that the film is "far better than most American-made pictures of its type" and ""although the story idea offers little that is novel, the action holds one's interest well mainly because of the imaginative settings, the elaborate space ship used by the invaders along with its many electronic gadgets, and the very good special effects by which catastrophic scenes of destruction are depicted while the invaders and the Earthians battle each other [with] all sorts of weapons."

The Monthly Film Bulletin noted that the version the reviewer viewed was a "banal American-dubbed version" and that its "main weaknesses are a slight and confused plot, under-developed characterisation and artless acting;" The review praised the film's "imaginative art direction and spectacular staging" which the review stated as "possibly the most dazzling display of pyrotechnics in the genre to date." Motion Picture Daily praised the film's effects, writing that "even the most jaded action fan will have to admit that some of the scenes of mass catastrophes, the seemingly endless sky and ground skirmishes and the ultra-modern 'Buck Rogers' settings have seldom, if ever, been equalled."

In a retrospective on Soviet science fiction film, British director Alex Cox compared The Mysterians to First Spaceship on Venus but described the latter as "more complex and morally ambiguous." AllMovie praises the film for its special effects. In a retrospective review, Sight & Sound found that "Its space-age visuals and colourful design anticipate the spectacular fantasies Honda would go on to make for Toho in the [1960s], including Mothra, Godzilla vs. The Thing, Ghidrah The Three-Headed Monster and Invasion of the Astro-Monsters."

See also
 List of Japanese films of 1957

References

Footnotes

Sources

External links

 
 
 
 

1950s science fiction films
1957 films
Films scored by Akira Ifukube
Films directed by Ishirō Honda
Films produced by Tomoyuki Tanaka
Films set in Shizuoka Prefecture
Films set in Tochigi Prefecture
Films set in Tokyo
Films set in Yamanashi Prefecture
1950s Japanese-language films
Kaiju films
1950s monster movies
Japanese robot films
Toho tokusatsu films
Alien invasions in films
1950s Japanese films